The 2004–05 season was the Spurs' 29th season in the National Basketball Association, the 32nd in San Antonio, and 38th season as a franchise. During the offseason, the Spurs signed free agent Brent Barry. The Spurs got off to a solid start, winning 16 of their first 20 games, entering the New Year with a 25–6 record. In February 2005, the Spurs traded longtime Spur Malik Rose and two draft choices to the New York Knicks for Jamison Brewer and center Nazr Mohammed. Late in the season, the team signed free agent forward Glenn Robinson. The Spurs finished first place in the Southwest Division, and second in the Western Conference with a 59–23 record. Tim Duncan and Manu Ginobili were both voted to play in the 2005 NBA All-Star Game, which was hosted in Denver. This was Ginobili's first All-Star appearance.

In the first round of the playoffs, the Spurs lost Game 1 at home to the Denver Nuggets 93–87, but would beat them in five games. In the semifinals, they defeated the Seattle SuperSonics in six games, then upset the top-seeded Phoenix Suns, which featured regular season MVP Steve Nash, Amar'e Stoudemire and Shawn Marion in five games in the Western Conference Finals. In the Finals, the Spurs would win their third NBA championship, defeating the 2004 NBA champions, the Detroit Pistons, in a seven-game series. Following the season, Glenn Robinson retired.

Draft picks

Roster

Regular season

Overview
After their disappointing second round collapse to the Los Angeles Lakers, the Spurs looked to regain the NBA crown. They would get off to a quick start, posting a 12-3 record in November. The Spurs would stay hot through December as they established a 25-6 record entering the New Year. The Spurs would be near the top in the Western Conference all season battling the Phoenix Suns for the best record in the NBA. Just as it appeared the Spurs would cruise toward the playoffs, their season suddenly hit a bump in the road when Tim Duncan went down in a March 20 loss to the Detroit Pistons with a sprained ankle. The rest of the way, the Spurs would limp home winning 9 of their last 17 as they held on to the Southwest Division by just 1 game with a 59-23 record. The Spurs leading scorer during the season was Tim Duncan with 20.3 PPG.

Standings

Record vs. opponents

Game log

November
Record: 12–3; Home: 6–0; Road: 6–3

 Green background indicates win.
 Red background indicates loss.

December
Record: 13–3; Home: 8–1; Road: 5–2

January
Record: 12–4; Home: 9–0; Road: 3–4

February
Record: 6–3; Home: 1–1; Road: 5–2

March
Record: 10-5; Home: 10-1; Road: 0-4

April
Record: 6-5; Home: 4-0; Road: 2-5

Player stats

Regular season

* Statistics include only games with the Spurs

Playoffs

Playoffs

|- align="center" bgcolor="#ffcccc"
| 1
| April 24
| Denver
| L 87–93
| Manu Ginóbili (23)
| Nazr Mohammed (15)
| Tony Parker (6)
| SBC Center18,797
| 0–1
|- align="center" bgcolor="#ccffcc"
| 2
| April 27
| Denver
| W 104–76
| Tim Duncan (24)
| Duncan, Horry (9)
| Tony Parker (6)
| SBC Center18,797
| 1–1
|- align="center" bgcolor="#ccffcc"
| 3
| April 30
| @ Denver
| W 86–78
| Manu Ginóbili (32)
| Tim Duncan (11)
| Brent Barry (4)
| Pepsi Center19,913
| 2–1
|- align="center" bgcolor="#ccffcc"
| 4
| May 2
| @ Denver
| W 126–115 (OT)
| Tim Duncan (39)
| Tim Duncan (8)
| Tony Parker (7)
| Pepsi Center19,776
| 3–1
|- align="center" bgcolor="#ccffcc"
| 5
| May 4
| Denver
| W 99–89
| Tony Parker (21)
| Nazr Mohammed (13)
| Tony Parker (7)
| SBC Center18,797
| 4–1
|-

|- align="center" bgcolor="#ccffcc"
| 1
| May 8
| Seattle
| W 103–81
| Tony Parker (29)
| Tim Duncan (9)
| Tim Duncan (5)
| SBC Center18,797
| 1–0
|- align="center" bgcolor="#ccffcc"
| 2
| May 10
| Seattle
| W 108–91
| Manu Ginóbili (28)
| Nazr Mohammed (10)
| Tony Parker (7)
| SBC Center18,797
| 2–0
|- align="center" bgcolor="#ffcccc"
| 3
| May 12
| @ Seattle
| L 91–92
| Tim Duncan (23)
| Tim Duncan (11)
| Tony Parker (8)
| KeyArena17,072
| 2–1
|- align="center" bgcolor="#ffcccc"
| 4
| May 15
| @ Seattle
| L 89–101
| Tim Duncan (35)
| Tim Duncan (10)
| Bowen, Parker (3)
| KeyArena17,072
| 2–2
|- align="center" bgcolor="#ccffcc"
| 5
| May 17
| Seattle
| W 103–90
| Manu Ginóbili (39)
| Tim Duncan (14)
| Manu Ginóbili (6)
| SBC Center18,797
| 3–2
|- align="center" bgcolor="#ccffcc"
| 6
| May 19
| @ Seattle
| W 98–96
| Tim Duncan (26)
| Tim Duncan (9)
| Manu Ginóbili (7)
| KeyArena17,072
| 4–2
|-

|- align="center" bgcolor="#ccffcc"
| 1
| May 22
| @ Phoenix
| W 121–114
| Tony Parker (29)
| Tim Duncan (15)
| Manu Ginóbili (5)
| America West Arena18,422
| 1–0
|- align="center" bgcolor="#ccffcc"
| 2
| May 24
| @ Phoenix
| W 111–108
| Tim Duncan (30)
| Duncan, Mohammed (8)
| Tony Parker (5)
| America West Arena18,422
| 2–0
|- align="center" bgcolor="#ccffcc"
| 3
| May 28
| Phoenix
| W 102–92
| Tim Duncan (33)
| Tim Duncan (15)
| Tony Parker (7)
| SBC Center18,797
| 3–0
|- align="center" bgcolor="#ffcccc"
| 4
| May 30
| Phoenix
| L 106–111
| Manu Ginóbili (28)
| Tim Duncan (16)
| Manu Ginóbili (7)
| SBC Center18,797
| 3–1
|- align="center" bgcolor="#ccffcc"
| 5
| June 1
| @ Phoenix
| W 101–95
| Tim Duncan (31)
| Tim Duncan (15)
| Manu Ginóbili (6)
| America West Arena18,422
| 4–1
|-

|- align="center" bgcolor="#ccffcc"
| 1
| June 9
| Detroit
| W 84–69
| Manu Ginóbili (26)
| Tim Duncan (17)
| Horry, Parker (3)
| SBC Center18,797
| 1–0
|- align="center" bgcolor="#ccffcc"
| 2
| June 12
| Detroit
| W 97–76
| Manu Ginóbili (27)
| Tim Duncan (11)
| Manu Ginóbili (7)
| SBC Center18,797
| 2–0
|- align="center" bgcolor="#ffcccc"
| 3
| June 14
| @ Detroit
| L 79–96
| Tony Parker (21)
| Tim Duncan (10)
| Bowen, Parker (4)
| The Palace of Auburn Hills22,076
| 2–1
|- align="center" bgcolor="#ffcccc"
| 4
| June 16
| @ Detroit
| L 71–102
| Tim Duncan (16)
| Tim Duncan (16)
| Bowen, Parker (4)
| The Palace of Auburn Hills22,076
| 2–2
|- align="center" bgcolor="#ccffcc"
| 5
| June 19
| @ Detroit
| W 96–95 (OT)
| Tim Duncan (26)
| Tim Duncan (19)
| Manu Ginóbili (9)
| The Palace of Auburn Hills22,076
| 3–2
|- align="center" bgcolor="#ffcccc"
| 6
| June 21
| Detroit
| L 86–95
| Duncan, Ginóbili (21)
| Tim Duncan (15)
| Tony Parker (5)
| SBC Center18,797
| 3–3
|- align="center" bgcolor="#ccffcc"
| 7
| June 23
| Detroit
| W 81–74
| Tim Duncan (25)
| Tim Duncan (11)
| Manu Ginóbili (4)
| SBC Center18,797
| 4–3
|-

NBA Finals

Game One

Manu Ginóbili was widely considered the star of the night, scoring in a virtuoso performance near the end of the game to lead the Spurs to victory. The Pistons were then left 'in the dust', the NBA website reported. Ginobili scored 15 of his 26 points in the fourth quarter to complement a huge game by Tim Duncan.

Ginobili, a famous Argentine All-Star, already with championship rings from the NBA and Euroleague and an Olympic gold medal (the only player in history with all three), got to work on his second NBA title by taking over in the final period. He scored eight points in a decisive 12-2 surge that gave the Spurs a 67-55 lead, then throttled a push by the Pistons with a swooping dunk, 3-pointer and running hook for an 81-67 advantage with less than two minutes to go.

Having been idle for a week, the Spurs looked weak. With their defense, however, they were able to overcome adversity. Tim Duncan, who had 24 points and 17 rebounds, also contributed. Although the Pistons tend to suddenly come alive in the fourth quarter, the converse was true this game as San Antonio put together a big quarter to take a commanding lead in the game.

Game Two

Coming into the game, it seemed as if the resilient Pistons, who survived two elimination games against Miami in the Eastern Finals, would come out strong and give the Spurs a challenge.  However, it was the Spurs who came out with a sense of urgency, as they did not want the Pistons to steal a game in San Antonio and take home court advantage away from them.  From the opening tip, Game 2 was all San Antonio as the Spurs got out to a quick lead and never looked back.

The Spurs took advantage of Detroit's uncharacteristic mistakes throughout the night, which included missing 9 shots from inside four feet from the basket.  While the Pistons went cold from behind the arc, not scoring a single 3-point basket, the Spurs made 11 3-pointers, including 4 each by Manu Ginóbili and Bruce Bowen, who did not score a point in game 1.  Ginobili finished the game with a game-high 27 points, while Tim Duncan finished with 18 points and 11 rebounds.  Antonio McDyess was the high scorer for Detroit, scoring 15 points off the bench.

The 2-0 lead proved a daunting challenge to Detroit, historically. In the history of the NBA, in the 153 times when a team with home court advantage was up 2-0 in a series, only seven times has the other team rebounded to win the series.

Game Three

Going into this game, the Pistons were looking to rebound from the deficit.

In the past, only two teams in NBA history had ever won a Finals series after facing a 2-0 deficit — the Boston Celtics in the 1969 NBA Finals and the Portland Trail Blazers in the 1977 NBA Finals — however, the Miami Heat would later accomplish this feat against the Dallas Mavericks in the 2006 NBA Finals.

Despite the tough challenge, the Pistons pulled through, and came out with several key steals and two scoring runs in the third quarter, then netted many insurance points in the fourth to win a big game which was a de facto must-win. Ben Wallace was lauded and commended by many for stepping up to the challenge.

When the end of the game came, and the 96-79 final score flashed upon the screens, many Pistons fans, celebrating in jubilation, started filling the air with confetti and conducted other celebratory customs. That was the first time that the Spurs have given up more than 90 points in a Finals game.

Game Four
Thursday, June 16, 2005, 21:00, at The Palace.

In this game also, as was previously observed in Game 3, the Pistons dominated the Spurs. Reporters began to remark about the tendency in this series for the home team to produce a blowout. Thus far, no game had been decided by less than 15 points.

Seven Pistons scored in double figures, and big games were collected from Rasheed Wallace, Chauncey Billups, Ben Wallace, and all the other élite stars of the franchise.

The outcome was never really in doubt, and the Pistons committed a Finals-record low four turnovers, but even this is often deemed an underestimation of the Pistons' defensive power. The deciding factor appears to have been the lack of possession time for the Spurs. This led to infrequent opportunities to score, and combined with an uncharacteristic scoring slump, the Spurs were only able to manage 71 points. For the second straight game, the Pistons scored more than 90 points against the Spurs.

Game Five

With the first four games of the 2005 Finals being blowouts by the home team, Game 5 was the close game everyone was waiting for, and it went down as one of the more memorable games in Finals history.

The game was closely contested by the two teams throughout the night as the lead changed 12 separate times, and the game was tied on 18 occasions. Regulation was not enough to settle this game, so the game went into overtime. The Pistons streaked out to a quick lead in the first few minutes of overtime, and seemed to have the game in hand. However, a missed opportunity with Detroit up 2 with 9 seconds to go opened the door for San Antonio. On the Spurs' next possession, Robert Horry inbounded the ball to Ginobili, who then gave it back to Horry, who was left wide open, to sink the game winning basket. Horry had previously already been famous for nailing the winning shot in Game 4 of the 2002 Western Conference Finals between the Lakers and Kings.

Horry went 5 for 6 from beyond the arc, including the game-winner, and scored 21 points coming off the bench, after not scoring until the final play of the 3rd quarter. He carried the team in the latter stages of the game as his teammates struggled with nerves that came with the weight of a must-win game on the road against an accomplished adversary. In addition to the game winning three pointer Horry made a spectacular left-handed dunk as the shot clock was winding in one possession, that is one of the highlights of the series. Incidentally, Horry happened to have the most NBA championships of any active player five, and looked to extend that to six.

Tim Duncan, despite struggling from the free-throw line, finished with 26 points and 19 rebounds for the Spurs.  Chauncey Billups was the high scorer for the Pistons, finishing with a game high 34 points in the losing effort.

Game Six

Game 6 was a close game all along, and the lead kept fluctuating between the two teams. Again, the leading stars on both teams played big games. Detroit pulled away early in the fourth for an 80-73 lead with five minutes to go, but the Spurs continued to threaten them. Soon, it was back to a one-point game.

Then, Rasheed Wallace planted a three-pointer to pull away, and even with a resilient game by the Spurs, the Pistons had clinched the victory.

Nevertheless, several Pistons free throws were necessary in the final moments of the game to put a win out of reach for the Spurs.

Rasheed Wallace had a big game to atone for the mistake he made for leaving Horry open in Game 5. Despite the fact that his mistake ultimately cost the Pistons the championship, Wallace was nonchalant about the play, even commenting incorrectly that he left Horry to guard Duncan.

Billups and Prince again led the Pistons with steady, unwavering defense, which is the key, as it is often said, to victory. Although Duncan and Ginobili finished with 21 points each, neither was able to seriously threaten the strong Pistons defense enough to win the game. Detroit thus won its fifth consecutive game facing elimination. The Pistons became the first road team to force a Game 7 in the NBA Finals.

Game Seven

For the first time in eleven years, the NBA Finals came down to a decisive game. Momentum was on Detroit's side, but the Spurs had home-court advantage. The Pistons were looking to become the first team to ever win the last 2 games on the road, after being down 3-2. The stats were, as expected, heavily in favor of the Spurs. NBA teams are 74-17 all-time at home in Game 7, and 9-0 when leading 3-2 going home.

The game, like the previous two games of the series, was closely contested for the first three quarters. But the Spurs took control in the fourth quarter and never looked back as for the second time in three years, the Spurs celebrated a championship on the SBC Center floor.  The Spurs won Game Seven  81-74, winning the franchise's third Larry O'Brien Trophy.  For the game, Tim Duncan finished with a game high 25 points and 11 rebounds, while teammate Manu Ginóbili pitched in with 23 points.  Richard Hamilton, with 15 points, was the high scorer for the Pistons, who fell just short of winning back to back championships.

Tim Duncan averaged 20.6 PPG on his way to his 3rd NBA Finals MVP award. Manu Ginóbili, Tony Parker, and Bruce Bowen each received their second championship ring, while Robert Horry became only the second player in NBA history (John Salley being the first) to play on championship teams for three different franchises.

Award winners
Tim Duncan, NBA Finals Most Valuable Player Award
Tim Duncan, All-NBA First Team
Tim Duncan, NBA All-Defensive First Team
Bruce Bowen, NBA All-Defensive First Team
Sam Quinn, NBA Assistant Coach of the Year

External links
 San Antonio Spurs on Database Basketball
 San Antonio Spurs on Basketball Reference

References

 

San Antonio Spurs seasons
NBA championship seasons
Western Conference (NBA) championship seasons
San Antonio
San Antonio
San Antonio